Ghazi Salar Masud or Ghazi Miyan (1014 – 1034 CE) was a semi-legendary Muslim figure from India. By the 12th century, he had become reputed as a warrior, and his tomb (dargah) at Bahraich, Uttar Pradesh, India, had become a place of pilgrimage.

The main source of information about him is the chivalric romance Mirat-i-Masudi ("Mirror of Masud"), a Persian-language hagiography written by Abdur Rahman Chishti in the 1620s. According to this biography, he was a nephew of the Ghaznavid invader Mahmud, and accompanied his uncle in the conquest of India during the early 11th century. However, the Ghaznavid chronicles do not mention him, and other claims in Mirat-i-Masudi are also of doubtful historicity.

Mirat-i-Masudi legend 

The Mirat-i-Masudi narrates the legend of Salar Masud as follows:

Early life 

In 1011 CE, the Muslims of Jalgaon, whose rights were being infringed upon by the local Hindu rulers, appealed Sultan Mahmud of Ghazni for help. Mahmud agreed to help them on the condition that they would mention his name in the Friday sermons (Khutbah), which would signify their acknowledgment of his suzerainty. Mahmud's general Salar Sahu defeated the Hindu rulers of Ajmer and surrounding regions. As a reward, Mahmud married his sister to Salar Sahu; Masud was the result of this marriage. Masud was born on 10 February 1014 CE, in Ajmer.

Military career 

Even as a child, Masud was a capable military leader and participated in his uncle Mahmud's campaigns. In fact, it was Masud who persuaded Mahmud to demolish the famous idol at the Hindu temple of Somnath, against the advice of Vizier Khwaja Hasan Maimandi.

Driven by martial and religious fervour, Masud asked the Ghaznavid emperor to be allowed to march to India and spread his empire and Islam there. At the age of 16, he invaded India, crossing the Indus river. He conquered Multan, and in the 18th month of his campaign, he arrived near Delhi. With help of a reinforcement from Ghazni, he conquered Delhi and remained there for 6 months. He then conquered Meerut after some resistance. Next, he proceeded to Kannauj, whose ruler received him as friend.

Masud established his headquarters at Satrikh, and dispatched separate forces to capture Bahraich, Gopamau and Benares. The local rulers, including the Raja of Bahraich, formed an alliance against his army. His father Salar Sahu then arrived at Bahraich and defeated the enemies. His father Salar Sahu died at Satrikh on 4 October 1032. Masud continued his expeditions.

Death 

The Hindu chiefs of Bahraich were not completely subjugated, so Masud himself arrived in Bahraich in 1033 CE. There he saw the ruins of a Hindu temple of the Sun God, near a sacred reservoir. He repeatedly expressed his desire to construct a mosque at the site "in order to neutralize the evil spell of the material sun with the power of the spiritual sun of Islam." He wished to destroy the shrine and reside there.

Masud inflicted defeat after defeat on his Hindu kings at Bahraich, until the arrival of a ruler named Suhaldev. He was defeated and mortally wounded in a battle against Suhaldev on 15 June 1034. While dying, he asked his followers to bury him on the banks of the sacred reservoir. He was buried where the image of the sun used to be present. As he was killed in a battle, he came to be known as a Ghazi (a religious warrior).

Other legends 

According to one legend, not attested by Mirat-i-Masudi, Masud cured one Zuhra (or Zohra) Bibi of blindness. Zuhra Bibi, who came from a noble family of Rudauli, married him. But before this marriage could be consummated, Masud was killed. Zuhra Bibi was also buried in Bahraich after her death. Later, a stone from her burial-vault was taken to Rudauli, where a cenotaph was built in her memory. In Rudauli, an annual fair called Zohra-Mela, attracted Hindus and Muslims of lower castes. During this festival, the pilgrims used to bring offerings called "Zuhra's dowry" to the cenotaph. Zuhra Bibi was also commemorated in a ritual during the Bahraich urs, which involved dressing two boys as Masud and Zuhra Bibi respectively.

Legacy

Delhi Sultanate period 

The contemporary 11th century Ghaznavid chronicles do not mention Masud at all. However, he had become a well-known figure in Delhi Sultanate by the 12th century, when the pilgrimage to his tomb in Bahraich appears to have started, during the Ghurid rule. In 1250, the Delhi Sultan Nasiruddin Mahmud constructed an architectural complex around the tomb, during his stay in Bahraich. The 13th century poet Amir Khusro appears to mention Masud's tomb (dargah) in a 1290 CE letter. According to this letter, the "fragrant tomb of martyred commander" at Bahraich spread the "perfume of odorous wood" throughout Hindustan. In 1341, the Delhi Sultan Muhammad bin Tughluq and the Moroccan traveler Ibn Battuta visited the Bahraich dargah. Ibn Battuta narrates the legends of the saints, and also provides some information about his cult, including the ritual veneration of his banner and spear.

The earliest source that connects Masud to the Ghaznavids is Ziauddin Barani's Tarikh-i-Firuz Shahi (1357), written nearly three hundred years later. Barani mentions Masud as one of the heroes of Mahmud's campaigns in India. The text was composed during the reign of the Delhi Sultan Firuz Shah Tughlaq, who considered himself to be a spiritual disciple of Masud. In 1353, the ruler of Lakhnauti (Bengal) invaded Bahraich, purportedly because he believed that a visit to Masud's dargah could cure him of vitiligo. In response, Firuz Shah Tughluq invaded Bengal. He also visited the Bahraich dargah in 1372. According to the Sultan's court historian Shams-i Siraj 'Afif, Masud appeared in the Sultan's dream, and asked him to prepare for the day of the Last Judgment, and to propagate Islam by adopting a tougher policy against the non-Muslims. The next day, Sultan Firuz Shah Tughluq got his head shaved like a Sufi neophyte, and started spending his nights in prayers. Not all Sultans of Delhi held Masud in same reverence: in 1490, Sultan Sikandar Lodi banned the urs (death anniversary) at the dargah, because of the "unseemliness of the rites being performed there".

In the 16th century, the Indo-Afghan soldier Dattu Sarvani claimed to have seen Masud in his dream.

Mughal period 

The earliest source that mentions Masud as a relative of Mahmud is Mughal court historian Abul Fazl's Ain-i-Akbari (16th century). The text states, "Salar Masud... was connected by blood with Mahmud Ghazni... sold his life bravely in battle and left an imperishable name." According to Abul Fazl, the cult of Masud was very popular: his dargah attracted pilgrims from remote districts. These pilgrims carried offerings and multi-coloured flags to the dargah, and encamped at the Mughal capital Agra on their way to Bahraich. Abul Fazl further states that in 1561 CE, the Mughal emperor Akbar himself walked among these pilgrims, disguised as an ordinary merchant visiting the urs celebrations at the dargah. In 1571 CE, Akbar made a grant for the Bahraich shrine.

The 17th century Persian language text Mirat-i-Masudi, written by the Sufi scholar Abdur Rahman Chishti, is the most comprehensive biography of Masud. The text is a historical romance, and the biography has a "gossipy feel". The author claims that Masud appeared in his dreams, and describes Masud's various achievements and miracles. He states that his work is based on an "Old History" written by one Mulla Mahmud Ghazanavi. The author further claims that the 11th century Masud was a disciple of the 12th century Sufi saint Moinuddin Chishti: the later historians have completely rejected this clear anachronism. According to Muzaffar Alam, Abdur Rahman Chishti's objective was to glorify the Chishtiya branch of Sufisim, as a counter to the rising influence of the Naqshbandi branch at the Mughal court.

In 1765, Akbar's grant was renewed by Shuja-ud-Daula, the Nawab of Awadh. His successor Asaf-ud-Daula visited the Bahraich shrine several times. Mirza Muhammad Qateel's Haft Tamasha (1811–12) and Cazim Ali's Barah Masa (1812) describe the ceremonies held to commemorate Masud. The Haft Tamasha mentions that an annual ceremony was held in Rudauli to mark Masud's death on the night of his wedding. A replica of Masud's nuptial bed was made and brought out for ceremonial viewing. The Barah Masa provides a description of the Bahraich shrine, and the ceremony held there. However, neither of these texts describe his life.

Gradually, Masud came to be known as a warrior-saint among the Muslims, who revered him as "Ghazi Miyan". Over time, the pilgrimage to his dargah increased so much that the site was not able to accommodate all the pilgrims. Consequently, his shrines were erected in other towns of the Awadh region, including Salargarh (named in his honour), Faizabad, Satrikh and Rudauli. The mazar of his father Salar Sahu (called "Birdha Baba" by Hindus) in Satrikh also became a pilgrimage site. Several tombs of people purported to be his fellow fighters were also erected; most of these tombs are fabricated. These tombs include the mazar of Makhdum Azizuddin (or Lal Pir) in Kannauj, the grave of the kotwal Miyan Rajab in Kannauj, and the mausoleum of Burhanuddin in Tambaur. People claimed to have seen ghosts of Miyan Rajab as a headless horseman. Some people in Faizabad claimed to have seen the whole army of Masud in form of ghosts.

Masud's followers also venerated him as a saint who miraculously cured leprosy. The most prominent among his followers were Meo Muslims (Mewatis), who are said to have been converted to Islam by him. Although the Naqshbandis, Wahhabis and some Islamic reformers criticized his cult, his popularity did not decline in the 18th century. The Punjabi Sufi poet Waris Shah named him among the five most venerated Sufi Pirs (saints).

British period 

In the 19th century, the British administrators were bewildered at the Hindu veneration of Masud. William Henry Sleeman, the British Resident in Awadh, remarked:

Russian orientalist Anna Suvorova notes that the rituals of the Masud's cult show some indigenous Hindu influence. The local Hindus revered Masud as "Bade Miyan" (Revered Boy), "Bale Pir" (Boy Saint), "Hathile Pir" (Obstinate Saint), "Pir Bahlim" and "Gajan Dulha".

Independent India 

In the 2000s, the majority of the visitors to the annual fair held at Masud's dargah were Hindus. According to the local legends glorifying Salar Masud, his killer Suhaldev was a cruel king who oppressed his subjects. However, the Hindu organizations have attempted to portray Suahldev as a Hindu icon who fought against a Muslim invader. In these narratives, Masud is portrayed as a cruel ruler who ravaged Hindu women.

According to local Hindus, Chittora near modern Bahraich is the place where he died in a battle. Hindu nationalist organizations have characterized Suhaldev as a saviour of Hindus against the Muslim invader Masud (popularly known as "Ghazi Mian"). They have constructed a temple dedicated to Suhaldev in Chittora.

See also
Gazi Pir
Legend of Suheldev: The King Who Saved India

References

Bibliography

External links 

 
 
 
 
 Mirat-i-Masudi, English translation in The History of India, as Told by Its Own Historians

Ghaznavid Empire
Medieval India